Ferrimolybdite is a hydrous iron molybdate mineral with formula: Fe3+2(MoO4)3·8(H2O) or Fe3+2(MoO4)3·n(H2O). It forms coatings and radial aggregates of soft yellow needles which crystallize in the orthorhombic system.

Discovery and occurrence
It was first described in 1914 for an occurrence in the Alekseevskii Mine in the Karysh River Basin, Khakassia Republic, Siberia, Russia. It was named for its composition (ferric iron and molybdenum).

It occurs as an oxidation product of molybdenum bearing ore deposits. 
Associated minerals include: molybdenite, pyrite and chalcopyrite.

References

Molybdenum minerals
Iron(III) minerals
Orthorhombic minerals
Minerals in space group 59